Filip Kiss (born 13 October 1990) is a Slovak professional footballer who plays as a midfielder for the Al-Ittihad Kalba.

Career
Kiss started his professional career at Inter Bratislava in 2008, before moving to Petržalka the following year where he made 23 league appearances. He again moved in 2010 to ŠK Slovan Bratislava.

Cardiff City
On 21 July 2011, Kiss joined Welsh club Cardiff City, who play in the Championship, on a season long loan. He made his debut for the club in a pre-season loss to Bournemouth coming as a substitute. After the game, both Kiss and Cardiff manager, Malky Mackay stated they wanted to extend the deal past the season long loan.
His first start for the Bluebirds was against Yeovil Town and the following day he was given the number 4 shirt for the season. However Kiss missed the first six games of the season with a hamstring injury. On 26 August, Malky Mackay confirmed he would be part of the squad to play Portsmouth the following day Despite making the bench Kiss didn't make an appearance in the 1–1 draw. He made his debut in a 2–0 win over Doncaster Rovers, he came on as a substitute for Craig Conway. Kiss made his full debut the following game in a 1–1 draw with Blackpool. His first goal for the club came against Derby County on 2 November. Kiss was used as a substitute in the League Cup final against Liverpool, which ended in a 3–2 penalty shootout defeat. It was confirmed on 1 July that an agreement had been reached between Cardiff City and Slovan Bratislava to allow Kiss to sign for the Bluebirds on a permanent basis.

Kiss's first game as a permanent Cardiff player, came on 17 August 2012, against Huddersfield Town where he came on as a substitute for Jordon Mutch. He played 100th professional game on 5 January 2013, in the FA Cup against Macclesfield Town. Kiss's game-time for the first team was limited in 2012–13, as the Club won the Championship, though the midfielder was a regular in the club's development squad.

Ross County
On 8 January 2014, Kiss signed for Scottish Premiership side Ross County on loan until the end of the season. He made his debut on 11 January 2014, scoring twice in a 3–3 draw against Partick Thistle. Kiss returned to Cardiff at the end of his loan having scored six times in 17 appearances. On 6 August 2014, Ross County announced they had re-signed Kiss on a season-long loan.

FK Haugesund
On 19 August 2015, Kiss joined Norwegian club FK Haugesund on a season-long loan.

International career
Kiss has represented both Slovakia U-19 and Slovakia U-21. He had a spell as the captain of the Under-21 team. Kiss made his debut for Slovakia's senior team in a 3–1 friendly victory over Israel on 5 March 2014.

Personal life
Kiss belongs to the Hungarian minority in Slovakia.

Career statistics

Honours
 Slovan Bratislava
 Corgoň liga: 2010–11
 Slovak Cup: 2010–11

 Cardiff City
 Football League Cup: Runners-up 2011–12

Slovakia
King's Cup: 2018

References

External links
 
 

1990 births
Living people
Sportspeople from Dunajská Streda
Slovak people of Hungarian descent
Slovak footballers
Slovak expatriate footballers
Slovakia international footballers
Association football midfielders
FK Inter Bratislava players
FC Petržalka players
ŠK Slovan Bratislava players
Cardiff City F.C. players
FK Haugesund players
Ross County F.C. players
Ettifaq FC players
Al-Ittihad Kalba SC players
Slovak Super Liga players
English Football League players
Scottish Professional Football League players
Eliteserien players
Saudi Professional League players
UAE Pro League players
Expatriate footballers in Norway
Expatriate footballers in Wales
Expatriate footballers in Scotland
Expatriate footballers in Saudi Arabia
Expatriate footballers in the United Arab Emirates
Slovak expatriate sportspeople in Norway
Slovak expatriate sportspeople in Wales
Slovak expatriate sportspeople in Scotland
Slovak expatriate sportspeople in Saudi Arabia
Slovak expatriate sportspeople in the United Arab Emirates